Pedro Alejandro 'Álex' Zalaya Galardón (born 29 April 1998) is a Spanish professional footballer who plays as a centre-back for Barcelona Atlètic.

Football career
Born in Zaragoza, Aragón, Zalaya represented Real Zaragoza as a youth. He made his senior debut for the reserves on 28 August 2016, starting in a 4–2 Tercera División home win against CD Belchite 97.

Zalaya made his professional debut on 7 September 2016, coming on as a second half substitute for fellow youth graduate Jorge Pombo in a 1–2 home loss against Real Valladolid, for the season's Copa del Rey. On 6 June of the following year, after achieving promotion to Segunda División B, he was promoted to the main squad.

On 31 July 2018, Zalaya moved to another reserve team, Sporting de Gijón B in the third division. On 17 August 2021, he agreed to a contract with Primera División RFEF side UE Cornellà.

On 1 September 2022, Zalaya joined FC Barcelona Atlètic on a one-year contract.

References

External links

Living people
Footballers from Zaragoza
Spanish footballers
Association football defenders
Segunda División B players
Tercera División players
Real Zaragoza B players
Real Zaragoza players
Sporting de Gijón B players
UE Cornellà players
Spain youth international footballers
FC Barcelona Atlètic players
1998 births
Sporting de Gijón players